Grass Bluff is a wedge-shaped rock bluff  northwest of Fluted Peak, in the southern part of the Roberts Massif, Antarctica. It was named by the Advisory Committee on Antarctic Names for Robert D. Grass, a United States Antarctic Research Program meteorologist at South Pole Station, winter 1964.

References

Cliffs of the Ross Dependency
Dufek Coast